The Trick in the Sheet (Original title:L'imbroglio Nel Lenzuolo) is a 2010 Italian romantic comedy film directed by Alfonso Arau. It stars Maria Grazia Cucinotta, Geraldine Chaplin, Anne Parillaud and Primo Reggiani. It was released in Italy on 18 June 2010.

Plot
In a small town in southern Italy in 1905, theatrical performances are accompanied by short silent film.

Federico (Reggiani), is fascinated by this new film technology and switches from a medical career to writing screenplays. He soon lands a gig as the director of a new short silent film. However, he is torn by the demands of those around him, his producer wants salacious storylines with nudity and his sister, who also owns the production company, craves something more edifying. Federico decides to recreate the Biblical story of the falsely accused Susanna, where she nakedly bathes and is leered at by two older men.

Federico becomes attracted to Beatrice, a visiting writer (Parillaud) but decides to use Marianna (Cucinotta), a peasant sorceress, as his Susanna. He uses footage of her bathing in the river for his film without her knowledge. When the film becomes a hit, she is mistaken for Susanna by nearly everyone in town which threatens to destroy her life.

Cast
Maria Grazia Cucinotta as Marianna
Geraldine Chaplin as Alma
Anne Parillaud as Beatrice
Miguel Ángel Silvestre as Giocondo
Angélica Aragón as Teresa
Giselda Volodi as Elena
Primo Reggiani as Federico
Maria Entraigues as Opera singer

References

External links
 

2010 films
Films set in the 1900s
Films about filmmaking
2010 romantic comedy films
Italian romantic comedy films
Spanish romantic comedy films
Films directed by Alfonso Arau
2010s Italian films